Ahmed Ali Khan (born 7 January 1981) is a Pakistani boxer. He competed in the men's middleweight event at the 2004 Summer Olympics.

References

1981 births
Living people
Pakistani male boxers
Olympic boxers of Pakistan
Boxers at the 2004 Summer Olympics
Place of birth missing (living people)
Asian Games silver medalists for Pakistan
Asian Games medalists in boxing
Boxers at the 2002 Asian Games
Medalists at the 2002 Asian Games
Middleweight boxers
21st-century Pakistani people